Swainsona greyana, commonly known as Darling Pea or  Hairy Darling Pea, is a shrubby perennial in the family Fabaceae that is native to Australia.  It grows to 1.5 metres high, has hairy stems and pinnate leaves that are 10 to 15 cm long. Racemes of 12 to 20 pea flowers are produced from September to March in the species' native range. These have white, pink or purple corollas. The pods that follow are elliptic in shape and 30 to 50 mm long.

It occurs on the banks of the lower Murray and Darling Rivers in South Australia, Victoria and New South Wales. The species was first formally described in 1846  by English botanist John Lindley in Edward's Botanical Register.

The plant contains the alkaloid swainsonine causing alpha-mannosidosis, a risk to grazing livestock.

In 2014, thousands of livestock mostly sheep were killed in western New South Wales region, after consuming darling pea, due to its addictive nature. As toxicity builds up it attacks an enzyme involved in metabolism, leading crippling of an animal's central nervous system, and symptoms like erratic behaviour, loss of co-ordination and depression. Previously in January 2013, a bush fire had burnt 53,000 hectares of the Warrumbungle National Park and farms at Coonabarabran leaving the weeds no competition and they rapidly spread in the area.

References 

greyana
Fabales of Australia
Flora of New South Wales
Flora of South Australia
Flora of Victoria (Australia)
Plants described in 1846